Northeast High School may refer to:

North Little Rock Northeast High School, North Little Rock, Arkansas (1970-1990)
Northeast High School (Oakland Park, Florida)
Northeast High School (St. Petersburg, Florida)
Northeast High School (Georgia), Macon, Georgia
Northeast High School (Louisiana), East Baton Rougle Parish, Louisiana
Northeast Senior High School (Pasadena, Maryland)
Northeast Metro Regional Vocational School, Wakefield, Massachusetts
Northeast High School (Missouri), Kansas City
Northeast High School (Philadelphia, Pennsylvania)
Northeast Catholic High School, Philadelphia, Pennsylvania

See also
North East High School (disambiguation)
Northeastern High School (disambiguation)